Clement Anthony Dortie (born July 1963) is a British TV personality and former Top of the Pops presenter. He set up his own production company called Triple T Entertainment. He has appeared on various popular entertainment networks such as BBC, Music Box, ITV (Schofield's Quest), British Film Institute, MTV, BBC World Service, 3e (Glam Slam) and various others as a host.

Early life
Dortie was born in London and grew up in Lewes, Sussex.

At school, Dortie was a contributor to Music Box, where he started his on-screen broadcast career. Moving to work for Children's BBC UP2U, he then joined Mark Franklin on 3 October 1991 as one of the regular hosts of the new look Top of the Pops, a position he held until 1994.

Dortie set up his own production company, Djem Productions Ltd.

Television format creation
Dortie enjoyed his first breakthrough from creating and writing TV formats with the show, TXTC, which was broadcast first in Thailand, and then many other Asian countries.  In 2004, TXTC was nominated for an Asian TV Award for best game show. Dortie next wrote Chain Reaction for Fox8 in Australia hosted by Mieke Buchan.
 
His writing skills caught the attention of FremantleMedia, and then 2waytraffic, where he enjoyed success with TXTC.

MC and Red Carpet host
A chance meeting with the UK team behind G-Unit led Dortie into becoming an MC and appearing regularly as the Saturday night host of Madnights at "Cirque at the Hippodrome", as well as touring internationally. During this time he worked on stage with Pharrell, Akon, Simon Webbe, Lethal Bizzle, D12, Flawless and hosted a live Pimp My Ride International with Xzibit.

Under the banner of his new company Triple T Entertainment (referred to commonly as TTT), Dortie wrote and created Million Dollar Babes for ITV2. Broadcast Magazine Million Dollar Babes

References

Living people
Television personalities from London
People from Lewes
Black British male actors
1963 births
Top of the Pops presenters